Dacke may refer to:
 Nils Dacke (died 1543), Swedish rebel leader
 Marie Dacke (born 1973), Swedish biologist
 Fabian Månsson (1872–1938), Swedish politician
 7217 Dacke, an asteroid

See also 
 Dacke War, the conflict between Nils Dacke and Gustav Vasa